Avraham Deutsch (born 1889, died 25 May 1953) was an Israeli politician who served as a member of the Knesset for Agudat Yisrael between 1951 and 1953.

Biography
Born in the Hungarian part of Austria-Hungary, Deutsch was educated in yeshivas, and was certified as a rabbi. He later studied at the University of Vienna, gaining a doctorate in pedagogy and philosophy.

In 1920, he moved to Budapest and became director of the educational institutions of the local Orthodox community. In 1943, he represented Hungarian Jews at the Bermuda Conference, which aimed to decide what to do with Jews who had been liberated by Allied forces. He escaped from Nazi-controlled Hungary to Switzerland  with the Kastner train.

In 1950, he made aliyah to Israel, where he became chief supervisor of Agudat Yisrael's educational system and chairman of the party's education department. In 1951, he was elected to the Knesset on the party's list. He died whilst still an MK in 1953. His seat was taken by Zalman Ben-Ya'akov.

References

External links
 

1889 births
1953 deaths
Members of the 2nd Knesset (1951–1955)
Israeli rabbis
Rabbis from Budapest
Bergen-Belsen concentration camp survivors
University of Vienna alumni
Hungarian emigrants to Israel
Agudat Yisrael politicians
Austro-Hungarian Jews
Rabbinic members of the Knesset